Puerto Rico Highway 117 (PR-117) is a rural road that travels from Lajas, Puerto Rico to Sabana Grande. It begins at its junction with PR-116 and PR-315 south of downtown Lajas and ends at its intersection with PR-121 in southern Sabana Grande.

Major intersections

See also

 List of highways numbered 117

References

External links
 

117